The men's shot put at the 2013 World Championships in Athletics was held at the Luzhniki Stadium on 15–16 August.

Records
Prior to the competition, the established records were as follows.

Qualification standards

Schedule

Results

Qualification
Qualification: Qualifying performance 20.65 (Q) or at least 12 best performers (q).

Final
The final was started at 20:10.

References

External links
Shot put results at IAAF website

Shot put
Shot put at the World Athletics Championships